This article describes the group stage of the 2012–13 EHF Champions League.

Format
The 24 teams were split into four groups, consisting of six teams. Each team played a home and away game against all opponents in the group. The first four ranked teams advanced to the knockout stage.

Seedings
The draw for the group stage took place at the Gartenhotel Altmannsdorf in Vienna on 6 July 2012 at 11:00 local time. A total of 24 teams were drawn into four groups of six. Teams were divided into six pots, based on EHF coefficients. Clubs from the same pot or the same association could not be drawn into the same group, except the wild card tournament winner, which did not enjoy any protection.

th Title holder. The title holder automatically gets the top position of seeding list.
Q Qualified through qualification tournament
WC Qualified through wild card tournament

Notes
Note 1: AG København was seeded in pot 1 for the 2012–13 EHF Champions League group stage draw, which took place in Vienna, Austria, on 6 July 2012. However, the club filed for bankruptcy on July 31, 2012 and their place in the group stage was awarded to Bjerringbro-Silkeborg.

Groups

Times up to 27 October 2012 (matchdays 1–4) are CEST (UTC+2), thereafter (matchdays 5–10) times are CET (UTC+1).

Group A

Group B

Group C

Notes
Note 1: AG København was seeded in pot 1 for the 2012–13 EHF Champions League group stage draw, which took place in Vienna, Austria, on 6 July 2012. However, the club filed for bankruptcy on July 31, 2012 and their place in the group stage was awarded to Bjerringbro-Silkeborg.

Group D

References

External links
Official website

2012–13 EHF Champions League